Iceland competed at the 1960 Summer Olympics in Rome, Italy.

Results by event

Athletics

Men
Track & road events

Field events

Combined events – Decathlon

Swimming

Men

Women

References
Official Olympic Reports

Nations at the 1960 Summer Olympics
1960
Summer Olympics